The World is a Ball is a 1986 album by M + M. The album was recorded in Canada and in Bath, England.

The album's only notable single was "Song in My Head". Due to the album's poor chart performance, the band retired for several years, not releasing a new album until 1992's Modern Lullaby.

Track listing

Personnel
Martha Johnson - guitar, keyboards, vocals
Mark Gane - guitar, keyboards, vocals
Eluriel Tinker - bass
Yogi Horton - drums
Michael Sloski - drums
Dick Smith - percussion
Paul Ridout - programming
Tony Levin, Jerry Marotta, Shawne Jackson, Colina Phillips, Ruby Turner - background vocals

References

1986 albums
Martha and the Muffins albums
RCA Records albums